The Ute mythology is the mythology of the Ute people, a tribe of Native Americans from the Western United States.

Ute Creation Story 
Due to copyright, the mythological story of the creation of the Utes may be found on their official website.

Bear Dance 
As told by Snake John, the story of the origin of the bear dance goes as follows:"In the fall the snow comes, and the bear has a wickiup in a hole. He stays there all winter, perhaps six moons. In the spring the snow goes, and he comes out. The bear dances up to a big tree on his hind feet. He dances up and back, back and fouth, and sings, "Um, um, um, um!" He makes a path up to the tree, embraces it, and goes back again, singing "Um, Um, Um!" He dances very much, all the time. Now Indians do it, and call it the "Bear Dance." It happens in the spring, and they do not dance in the winter. The bear understands the Bear Dance."

Key Ute Mythological Figures

Wolf 

 "Creator and culture hero of the Ute tribe. Like other figures from the mythic age, Wolf is usually represented as a man in Ute stories, but sometimes takes on the literal form of a wolf."

Coyote 

 "Wolf's younger brother, Coyote is a trickster figure. Though he often assists his brother and sometimes even does good deeds for the people, Coyotes behavior is so irresponsible and frivolous that he is constantly getting himself and those around him into trouble."

Folk tales
 Pokoh, the Old Man
 Blood Clot
 Porcupine Hunts Buffalo, Hunt deer, Hunt elk, Hunt grasshoppers
 Puma and the Bear
 Two Grandsons
 Coyote & Duck

References

Ute tribe
Uto-Aztecan mythology